Spiral Jetty is an earthwork sculpture constructed in April 1970 that is considered to be the most important work of American sculptor Robert Smithson. Smithson documented the construction of the sculpture in a 32-minute color film also titled Spiral Jetty.

In 1999, the artwork was donated to the Dia Art Foundation and is one of 11 locations and sites they manage. Since its initial construction, those interested in its fate have dealt with questions of proposed changes in land use in the area surrounding the sculpture. In order to preserve the work, Dia Art Foundation asks that visitors do not take existing rocks from the artwork, make fire pits, or trample vegetation. There are no facilities at the site so visitors must carry out any waste with them.

Description
The sculpture is built of mud, precipitated salt crystals, and basalt rocks. Depending upon the water level of the Great Salt Lake, the sculpture is sometimes visible and sometimes submerged.

Construction

Smithson reportedly chose the Rozel Point site based on the blood-red color of the water and its connection with the primordial sea. The red hue of the water is due to the presence of salt-tolerant bacteria and algae that thrive in the extreme 27 percent salinity of the lake's north arm, which was isolated from freshwater sources by the building of a causeway by the Southern Pacific Railroad in 1959.

Smithson was reportedly attracted to the Rozel Point site because of the stark anti-pastoral beauty and industrial remnants from nearby Golden Spike National Historic Site, as well as an old pier and a few unused oil rigs. While observing the construction of the piece from a helicopter, Smithson reportedly remarked "et in Utah ego" as a counterpoint to the pastoral Baroque painting et in Arcadia ego by Nicolas Poussin.

To move the rock into the lake, Smithson hired Bob Phillips of nearby Ogden, Utah, who used two dump trucks, a large tractor, and a front end loader to haul the 6,650 tons of rock and earth into the lake. It is reported that Smithson had a difficult time convincing a contractor to accept the unusual proposal. Spiral Jetty was the first of his pieces to require the acquisition of land rights and earthmoving equipment. Phillips often told people that his best-known construction job was "the only thing I ever built that ... was to look at and had no purpose".

Phillips described the use of earth-moving equipment along the lakeside as "tricky", and said of Smithson that "I don’t think he had done any geology work or anything on it. He just had in his mind what it should look like.… He just had the eye for it. I assume it was the artist in him." Work began on the jetty in April 1970. The work was constructed twice; the first time requiring six days. After contemplating the result for two days, Smithson called the crew back and had the shape altered to its present configuration, an effort requiring moving 7,000 tons of basalt rock during an additional three days.

Phillips' son appeared on the PBS Antiques Roadshow program in 2017 with a photograph and collection of documents related to the building of the project.

Ownership
The sculpture was financed in part by a $9,000 USD grant from the Virginia Dwan Gallery of New York. In 1999, Spiral Jetty was donated to Dia Art Foundation. As owner and custodian of Spiral Jetty, the foundation maintains the lease from the Utah Division of Forestry, Fire & State Lands of state sovereign lands in Great Salt Lake upon which the artwork is sited.

Smithson died in a plane crash in Texas three years after finishing the Spiral Jetty.

Preservation

At the time Dia acquired Spiral Jetty, the work was fully submerged in the lake. Beginning in the early 2000s, however, sustained drought in Utah caused water levels to recede, and Spiral Jetty became visible for the first prolonged period in its history. As a result, the prominence of Spiral Jetty has risen dramatically over the past decade, increasing both the visitorship to the site and the public’s interest in the artwork, at the local, national, and international levels.

Dia is committed to maintaining a photographic record of the work and documenting changes to the piece over time. Dia collaborates with two organizations in Utah, the Great Salt Lake Institute at Westminster College (GSLI) and the Utah Museum of Fine Arts (UMFA) at the University of Utah, who have been deeply involved in the advocacy of Spiral Jetty over the years.

The issue of preservation has been complicated by ambiguous statements by Smithson, who expressed an admiration for entropy in that he intended his works to mimic earthly attributes in that they remain in a state of arrested disruption and not be kept from destruction.

Dia's website states that visitors are prohibited from removing rocks from the artwork or from stepping on vegetation that is on the grounds of the artwork. Visitors are also prohibited from constructing fire pits near the artwork or on the parking lot. If caught, visitors will face strict fines. The website also states that visitors are instructed to carry out their waste.

In 2008 plans were announced for exploratory oil drilling approximately five miles from the jetty. This was met with strong resistance from artists, and the state of Utah received more than 3,000 e-mails about the plan, most opposing the drilling.

Film

In 1970 during the construction of the jetty, Robert Smithson wrote and directed a 32-minute color film, Spiral Jetty. The film was shot by Smithson and his wife Nancy Holt, and funded by Virginia Dwan and Douglas Christmas.

The film documented the construction process and also formed an ancillary artwork.  Smithson combines his interest in geology, paleontology, astronomy, mythology and cinema, stating that he had an interest in documenting "the earth's history". In conjunction with filmed sequences of the jetty, Smithson incorporates footage of dinosaurs in a natural history museum and the ripped pages from a history text. During this scene, Smithson refers to the institutions of history: "the earth's history seems at times like a story recorded in a book, each page of which is torn into small pieces. Many of the pages and some of the pieces of each page are missing". Smithson's narrative supports an alternative view of historical discourse and the art object's placement or production outside of the museum institution. His writings also indicate that the helicopter film sequences over the jetty were a method of "recapitulating the scale of the jetty". By visually disorienting the viewer, Smithson is able to negate a time and place for the materiality of the artwork or create what he calls a "cosmic rupture". Through this state, the viewer is meant to be unable to categorize or classify the site, and will be left in a state free from the dialect of history.

Legacy 

The work was named Utah's official state work of land art in 2017. April 2020 marked the Spiral Jettys 50th anniversary, which Smithson referred to shortly before his death in 1973 as "the work of the decade".

References

External links 

 Dia Art Foundation with directions to the Jetty.
 Slideshow, time-lapse video, and QuickTime VR of Spiral Jetty
 Pictures of Robert Smithson's Spiral Jetty
 Review of Smithson's movie about the Spiral Jetty project
 Spiral Jetty flickr Group
 
 The Spiral Jettys Visibility
 Archivist on the Road: Spiral Jetty, Archives of American Art Blog, Smithsonian Institution
 Restoring Spiral Jetty: What If?, discussing restoration plans

Land art
1970 sculptures
Outdoor sculptures in Utah
Great Salt Lake
Institut Valencià d'Art Modern